Speedy Ortiz is an American indie rock band from Northampton, Massachusetts, United States. Originally a solo project for founder Sadie Dupuis, from 2011 a full band incarnation has released three EPs and three LPs mostly on Carpark Records.

History

Early years (2011–2012)
The band originated in 2011 as Sadie Dupuis' solo project shortly after she moved to Northampton to work on her MFA. While Dupuis was teaching songwriting at a summer camp, she would also record her own material on a laptop in her spare time. Two releases resulted from this solo endeavor, the Cop Kicker EP, and the album, The Death of Speedy Ortiz.

The band was named after a character from the comic book series Love & Rockets who committed suicide. Dupuis explained that when she began making demos for this project, her "roommate had passed away of a heart attack super young...And [her] childhood best friend had overdosed." She found the storyline relatable and named the band "Speedy Ortiz" in reference "to how everybody else deals with his loss. And that is sort of what the songs were for me in the beginning."

The project expanded into a full band in late 2011. The group independently released "Taylor Swift" b/w "Swim Fan," recorded by Paul Q Kolderie, which was followed by 2012's Sports, released on Exploding in Sound Records. The Phoenix named Speedy Ortiz the "Best New Band in MA" in 2012.

Major Arcana and Real Hair (2013–14)
Prior to the release of their debut studio album, the band released "Ka-Prow!" b/w "Hexxy" on April 30, 2013, via Inflated Records.

Major Arcana was released on Carpark Records on July 9, 2013. Recorded by Justin Pizzoferrato (engineer for Dinosaur Jr and Thurston Moore), the album was recorded over 4 days at Sonelab. Inspired by a history of the occult book that Dupuis read, "the lyrics reference occult staples like sulfur and salt". The song "No Below" was used in the soundtrack of the Square Enix game Life Is Strange: Before the Storm.

The album received critical acclaim upon release. Pitchfork's Lindsay Zoladz gave the album 8.4 and deemed it "Best New Music", writing that "Speedy Ortiz join a small club of young indie rock bands writing lyrics that are actually worth poring over". Meanwhile, The A.V. Club David Brusie wrote "Major Arcana is a markedly assured debut, one that makes Speedy Ortiz an act to watch. Like its songs, the band’s detonation is inevitable."

In support of the album, the band booked and self-organized a 6-week US tour, in addition to a 17-date tour in all-ages venues and DIY spaces as well as opening for The Breeders and Stephen Malkmus and the Jicks for a run of dates. Additional stops included appearances at Primavera, Bonnaroo, and Pitchfork Festival.

On February 11, 2014, the band released the Real Hair EP on Carpark Records reuniting with Paul Q Kolderie and Justin Pizzoferrato. The EP was written during a lull period between tours over four days, "before we left on our summer tour before the album came out." In support of the release, the band embarked on a UK/EU tour with Joanna Gruesome.

In 2014, guitarist Matt Robidoux was replaced by fellow Massachusetts musician Devin McKnight of Grass is Green. On July 11, 2014, the band shared the song "Bigger Party" via the Adult Swim Singles Program 2014. In the fall, the band released another song, "Doomsday," via Famous Class’ LAMC series in which all digital proceeds went to the Ariel Panero Memorial Fund at VH1 Save the Music.

Foil Deer (2015–2017)
On January 21, 2015, Dupuis announced their second studio album, Foil Deer, which was released on April 21, 2015. Written over a month-long retreat in the woods of Connecticut and recorded over three weeks at producer Nicolas Vernhes’ Rare Book Room studio in Brooklyn, Dupuis described the album as "a more textured and calculated record than its volcanic predecessor, the writing more measured and less reactionary".

The album's title and cover art were inspired by the sculpture "Le Cerf" by Ossip Zadkine. Dupuis noted in an interview with Pitchfork that as a "stay-at-home talking-to-no one kind of person", she identified with the "image of this gilded, shiny deer, which is naturally sort of a skittish, reclusive animal".

2015 was a breakout year for Speedy Ortiz, as Foil Deer was met with critical praise. NPR described Dupuis "as one of rock's most compelling young voices and lyricists". Pitchfork noted in their review of the album, 'The album is ferocious and visceral, the lyrics gleaming with threads involving sharp blades both literal and figurative...As Dupuis grows more self-possessed, she and her bandmates veer into their most ambitious compositions to date." The New York Times praised the album and compared it“As if Fiona Apple joined a punk band, with...even more vocal confidence".

Also in 2015, Speedy Ortiz cleaned up in the top three categories of The Boston Music Awards, including artist, album/EP (Foil Deer), and song of the year ("Raising the Skate"). They also won for best charitable effort for donating net proceeds from their latest tour to the Girls Rock Camp Foundation.
Foil Deer also earned the band the title of Noisey's Artist of the Year for 2015. On the band, Noisey said: "They exist to give back to their community. They exist to empower you. They exist to make you put your fist in the air. The band embodies what the genre of punk rock started out as—powerful guitars and a dominant stage presence—but have also brought along the bold message that no matter who you are or what you’re feeling, you’re OK."

In support of the record, the band toured extensively in North America and Europe tours supported by artists including Mitski, Alex G, Downtown Boys, Palehound, Krill, and Trust Fund as well as embarking on co-headline dates with Ex Hex, The Good Life, and Hop Along. The band also made appearances at Outside Lands, Forecastle Festival, and Riot Fest.

In December 2015, the band embarked on an all-ages benefit tour with 100% of net proceeds to the Girls Rock Camp Foundation, "a non-profit that generates funding for camps designed to help girls develop real-world skills and artistic expression through musical collaboration". On May 9, 2016, the band announced the Foiled Again EP featuring remixes from Lizzo, Lazerbeak, and Open Mike Eagle and outtakes from Foil Deer. The EP included the track "Death Note", which took its name from the eponymous manga/anime series.

On February 20, 2017, the band released the track "In My Way" as part of the Our First 100 Days compilation, benefiting organizations that support causes endangered by the Trump administration. On July 7, 2017, the band released the song "Screen Gem" to coincide with the announcement of Devin McKnight's departure. Proceeds from the track sales benefited the criminal justice reform nonprofit CLOSErikers at McKnight's request.

Twerp Verse (2018–present)
On February 21, 2018, the band released the lead single "Lucky 88" from their third album, ‘Twerp Verse’, set to be released on April 27. Recorded at Silent Barn and mixed by Mike Mogis, the album is actually the band's second attempt at a new record as a previous attempt was scrapped following the election. Dupuis said that "The songs on the [scrapped] album that were strictly personal or lovey dovey just didn’t mean anything to me anymore". Twerp Verse is also the first album to feature the Philadelphia guitarist Andy Molholt of Laser Background.

“Lean In When I Suffer", the second single from the album, was released on March 21, 2018, accompanied by a video premiered by The Fader. "Villain", the third single from the album, was released on April 11, 2018.

As of 2022, the band consists of Dupuis, Audrey Zee Whitesides, Andy Molholt, and Joey Doubek.

Members
Current 
Sadie Dupuis – lead vocals, lead guitar (2011–present)
Andy Molholt – rhythm guitar (2017–present)
Audrey Zee Whitesides – bass, backing vocals (2018–present)
Joey Doubek – drums (2019–present)

Former 
Devin McKnight – rhythm guitar (2014–2017)
Matt Robidoux – rhythm guitar (2011–2014)
Mike Falcone – drums, backing vocals (2011–2019)
Darl Ferm – bass (2011–2018)

Timeline

Discography

Albums
 Major Arcana (2013, Carpark)
 Foil Deer  (2015, Carpark)
 Twerp Verse (2018, Carpark)

EPs
 Sports (2012, Exploding in Sound)
 Real Hair (2014, Carpark)
 Foiled Again (2016, Carpark)

Demos
 Cop Kicker EP (2011, self-released)
 The Death of Speedy Ortiz (2011, self-released)

Singles
 "Taylor Swift" b/w "Swim Fan" (2012, self-released)
 "Ka-Prow!" b/w "Hexxy" (2013, Inflated)
 "Bigger Party" (2014, Adult Swim)
 "Doomsday" on Split with Chris Weisman (2014, LAMC)
 "Raising The Skate" (2015, Carpark)
 "The Graduates" (2015, Carpark)
 "In My Way" (2017)
 "Screen Gem" (2017)
 "Lucky 88" (2017)
 "Lean In When I Suffer" (2018)
 "Villain" (2018)
 "Blood Keeper" (Cover of Liz Phair's outtake from the album Whitechocolatespaceegg, 2018, Carpark)
 "Adult Swim Singles" (Includes "Bigger Party" and DTMFA) (2018)

Premieres and music videos

 Tiger Tank Video via SPIN (2013)
 No Below Video via Pitchfork (2013)
 Ka-Prow! Video via Youtube (2013)
 American Horror Video via SPIN (2014)
 The Graduates Video via NY Times (2015)
 Raising the Skates Video via Wired (2015)
 Swell Content Video via Jezebel (2015)
 My Dead Girl Video via Vanity Fair (2015)

References

External links
 

Alternative rock groups from Massachusetts
Indie rock musical groups from Massachusetts
Noise pop musical groups
Musical groups established in 2011
2011 establishments in Massachusetts
Musical quartets
Carpark Records artists